The women's freestyle 60 kilograms is a competition featured at the 2016 World Wrestling Championships, and was held in Budapest, Hungary on 11 December.

Results
Legend
F — Won by fall

Final

Top half

Bottom half

Repechage

References
Results Book, Page 44

Women's freestyle 60 kg
World